is a 2013 Japanese science fiction horror film directed by Mari Asato. The film made its North American premiere at LA Eigafest 2014.

Cast
 Asami Mizukawa as Shinobu Takamura/Shinobu Kirimura
 Senga Kento as Mitarai Takumi

Reception
As of 22 January 2014, the film had grossed ¥16.5 million in Japan. It has grossed HK$533,000 in Hong Kong.

References

External links
  
 

2013 films
2010s science fiction horror films
Films directed by Mari Asato
Japanese science fiction horror films
2010s Japanese films